Matthew Lee (born 1985 in Northampton), known professionally by his stage name Gammer, is an English music producer and DJ. He is best known for his association with UK hardcore, of which he is described as an icon. He is also the co-founder of the Together We Rise record label, which is dedicated to hardcore music.

Biography 
Regarded as one of the most prolific producers in the United Kingdom hardcore scene, Gammer initially began his musical career as a hard dance producer before switching to hardcore. He has also produced many UK hardcore songs under the name Matt Lee. One track in particular, Go, caught the attention of Andy Whitby, who signed him to AWsum.

Gammer first appeared in the hardcore scene in 2002 and has since released songs under the Essential Platinum label. A large majority of his songs on the label come from collaborations with Dougal, the label's founder who discovered him, although he also released under his own label, Muffin Music. He also releases with other artists of the hardcore genre, such as Hixxy and Darren Styles. His songs have also appeared in compilation albums, such as Bonkers.

In 2006, Gammer released A New Feeling, which was awarded "Song of the Year" at the Hardcore Heaven Awards. In April 2007, he founded Muffin Music, releasing a promotional mix. Between 2008 and 2012, he was awarded "Hardcore DJ of the Year", an award previously held by Darren Styles. His 2010 award is shared with Dougal.

In 2016, he participated with Styles at the 20th edition of the Electric Daisy Carnival in Las Vegas. The pair would also headline the Darren Styles b2b Gammer event in 2017.

Gammer has often released on the label Monstercat, where he's released tracks such as "Party Don't Stop", "Over the Edge", and an extended play, The Drop, whose title track became one of the most played festival dubstep songs of 2018 with eleven official remixes. Gammer has collaborated with fellow producer Kayzo for multiple songs including "Forever" and "Over the Edge", the latter of which was released on 11 August 2018. In July 2017, Gammer collaborated with Darren Styles and Dougal to release the single "Party Don't Stop" and the trio also released in September 2018 the single "Burning Up", both of which were released via Monstercat, the latter being part of their collaboration with the game Rocket League.

In January 2019, his remix of Ran-D's track, "Zombie", having been played in numerous live sets and mixes while still unreleased, was released on Armada as part of a 2 track remix package.

In 2021, Gammer began releasing singles from his upcoming debut full-length album through Dim Mak Records, including "Stampede" with Fatman Scoop, "NGMF" with Riot Ten, and "Replay the Night" with Staysick and Nytrix.

Discography

Albums 

 2012: Dougal and Gammer's Hardcore Anthems

Extended plays 

 2008: When I Close My Eyes
 2010: The 'Im Sorry These Songs Took So Long To Get Out' EP - Part 1
 2010: The 'Im Sorry These Songs Took So Long To Get Out' EP - Part 2
 2010: Insert Ep Title
 2010: The Gammer Remix EP
 2013: Dougal & Gammer EP
 2014: Dougal & Gammer EP Vol. 2
 2014: Darren Styles & Gammer EP
 2017: The Drop
2018: The Drop (The Remixes Pt.1)
2018: The Drop (The Remixes Pt.2)

Singles 
 2010: "Anybody Else But You" 
 2016: "Love You Everyday"  
 2017: "Love You Everyday: Redux" 
 2016: "Burn You Tonight" 
 2016: "Pigface (Dougal and Gammer Edit)"
 2016: "Never Stop" 
 2016: "Jaws 2016" 
 2016: "Shoulder Lock" 
 2017: "Feel Like This" 
 2017: "Red Drink Foam Party"
 2017: "Party Don't Stop" 
 2017: "Over the Edge" 
 2017: "Let's Get Crunk"
 2017: "Stay Tonight" 
 2018: "Big Tings" 
 2018: "Needed U"
 2018: "Forever" 
 2018: "Burning Up" 
 2018: "Sleep at Night" 
 2018: "Out with the Old" 
 2018: "Blow This" 
 2019: "Crank Up the Dank" 
 2019: "This is the End" 
 2019: "EDM Sucks" 
 2020: "Dysylm" 
 2020: "I'm With You" 
 2020: "The Feeling" 
2021: "Stampede" 
2021: "Ngmf" 
2021: "Replay the Night" 
2021: "Superhorn" 
2022  "Step Back" (with Pixel Terror)

Remixes 

 2015: Omegatypez - "Take Me High" (Kutski & Gammer Remix)
 2016: Porter Robinson - "Sad Machine (Darren Styles & Gammer Remix)
 2016: Kill the Noise - "All in My Head (feat. Awolnation)" (Darren Styles and Gammer Remix)
 2016: Kayzo - "Born Again" (Darren Styles & Gammer Remix)
 2017: Crankdat - "Dollars" (Crankdat, Ray Volpe and Gammer Remix)
 2017: Pegboard Nerds x Quiet Disorder - "Go Berzerk" (Gammer Remix)
 2017: Slander - "Superhuman"  (Gammer Remix)
 2018: Valentino Khan - "Lick It" (Gammer Remix)
 2018: A-Trak & Baauer - "Dumbo Drop" (Gammer Remix)
 2019: Ran-D - "Zombie" (Gammer Remix)
 2019: Space Laces - "Torque" (Gammer Remix)

References 

British electronic musicians
British DJs
UK hardcore musicians
1985 births
People from Northampton
Monstercat artists
House musicians
Hardstyle musicians
Living people
Electronic dance music DJs